Nicolò Antonio Pesci or Nicolò Antonio Piscibus was a Roman Catholic prelate who served as Bishop of Muro Lucano (1486–1517).

Biography
On 15 February 1486, Nicolò Antonio Pesci was appointed Bishop of Muro Lucano by Pope Innocent VIII.
He served as Bishop of Muro Lucano until his resignation in 1517. 
While bishop, he was the principal co-consecrator of principal co-consecrator of Antonio Maria Ciocchi del Monte, Bishop of Città di Castello (1506).

References 

15th-century Italian Roman Catholic bishops
Bishops appointed by Pope Innocent VIII